The Confederate Senate was the upper house of the Congress of the Confederate States of America. Its members were, like those of the United States Senate, elected for six year terms by the state legislature of each state, with each state having two senators. The Confederate Senate met only between 1862 and 1865.

In addition to the eleven states that made up the Confederacy, representatives were also seated from Kentucky and Missouri.

Members of the Confederate Senate were divided into classes by lot on February 21, 1862 as follows:

Class 1 (1862-64), (1864–70): Alabama, Arkansas, Florida, Georgia, Kentucky, Mississippi, Missouri, North Carolina
Class 2 (1862-66): Florida, Louisiana, Mississippi, Missouri, North Carolina, South Carolina, Tennessee, Texas, Virginia
Class 3 (1862-68): Alabama, Arkansas, Georgia, Kentucky, Louisiana, South Carolina, Tennessee, Texas, Virginia

Alabama

Arkansas

Florida

Georgia

Kentucky

Louisiana

Mississippi

Missouri

North Carolina

South Carolina

Tennessee

Texas

Virginia

 
1st Confederate States Congress
2nd Confederate States Congress
Confederate